Kandry-Tyumekeyevo (Qandra-Tömäkäy) is a rural locality (a village) in Nikolayevsky Selsoviet, Tuymazinsky District, Bashkortostan, Russia. The population was 135 as of 2010. There are 2 streets.

Geography 
Kandry-Tyumekeyevo is located 33 km southeast of Tuymazy (the district's administrative centre) by road. Kandrykul is the nearest rural locality.

References 

Rural localities in Tuymazinsky District